Roy Cameron Jenson, also known and credited as Roy Jensen, (February 9, 1927 – April 24, 2007) was a Canadian American football player, stuntman, and actor.

Early years
Born in Calgary, Alberta, Jenson moved to Los Angeles with his family as a child. He joined the United States Navy and then graduated from UCLA where he was a member of Delta Tau Delta International Fraternity. He then became a professional Canadian football player for the Calgary Stampeders and the BC Lions from 1951 through 1957.

Jenson was a lumberjack and a construction worker before he joined the United States Navy in World War II.

Television 
Jenson guest starred on NBC's television series Daniel Boone during the fourth season (1968–1969); however, he is remembered by many as the first man beaten up by Caine on the television series Kung Fu (1972), for his appearance in the Star Trek episode "The Omega Glory" and as the villain Puddler in Harper, he worked frequently in television in the 1970s and 1980s.

He also appeared in 1966 as “Troy” (a murdering outlaw) in S12E2’s “Goldtakers” on the TV Western Series Gunsmoke.

He also appeared in 1967 as “Dace Edwards” (a ranch hand) in S3E6’s “Ladykiller” on the TV Western Series The Big Valley.

He also appeared in episodes 11 and 12 of Batman in 1966, was the English newspaper printer in Season 5, Episode 136–2 of Bonanza, appeared in an episode of The Silent Force in 1970, and in 1976 guest-starred in an episode of Gibbsville.

Film 
A prolific character actor, Jenson appeared in such films as The Missouri Traveler, Warlock, 13 Ghosts, How the West Was Won, Waterhole No. 3, Our Man Flint, Big Jake, Harper, Bustin' Loose, Soylent Green, The Getaway, The Way We Were, The Outfit and Chinatown.

He also worked frequently with directors John Milius (Dillinger, The Wind and the Lion, Red Dawn) and Clint Eastwood (Thunderbolt and Lightfoot, The Gauntlet, Every Which Way but Loose, Any Which Way You Can, Honkytonk Man), as well as actor Geoffrey Lewis.

Death 
Jenson died of cancer in Los Angeles, California, aged 80. His son is actor Sasha Jenson.

Filmography

Film

Westward the Women (1951) – (uncredited)
Operation Secret (1952) – Michel (uncredited)
Fighter Attack (1953) – German Soldier (uncredited)
Demetrius and the Gladiators (1954) – Gladiator (uncredited)
The Caine Mutiny (1954) – Sailor (uncredited)
Broken Lance (1954) – Bailiff (uncredited)
The Harder They Fall (1956) – Fighter (uncredited)
Hell on Devil's Island (1957) – Bruiser No. 1 (uncredited)
Operation Mad Ball (1957) – Hospital Guard (uncredited)
The Missouri Traveler (1958) – Simpson
Buchanan Rides Alone (1958) – Hamp (uncredited)
The Last Hurrah (1958) – Fighter (uncredited)
Ride Lonesome (1959) – Outlaw (uncredited)
Al Capone (1959) – Customer (uncredited)
Warlock (1959) – Hasty (uncredited)
Career (1959) – Jeep Soldier (uncredited)
The Rise and Fall of Legs Diamond (1960) – Bodyguard (uncredited)
Bells Are Ringing (1960) – Cop (uncredited)
13 Ghosts (1960) – Ghost (uncredited)
Let No Man Write My Epitaph (1960) – Whitey (uncredited)
North to Alaska (1960) – Ole – Logger Punched by Sam (uncredited)
Flaming Star (1960) – Matt Holcom (uncredited)
The Wackiest Ship in the Army (1960) – Shark Bait – USS Echo Crewman (uncredited)
The Fiercest Heart (1961) – Boer (uncredited)
Atlantis, the Lost Continent (1961) – Guard (uncredited)
Marines, Let's Go (1961) – Sailor (uncredited)
The George Raft Story (1961) – Biggie (uncredited)
Confessions of an Opium Eater (1962) – Boat Crewman (uncredited)
Five Weeks in a Balloon (1962) – Guard (uncredited)
How the West Was Won (1962) – Henchman (uncredited)
Law of the Lawless (1964) – Roy Johnson
Stage to Thunder Rock (1964) – Harkins
36 Hours (1964) – Soldier (uncredited)
Baby the Rain Must Fall (1965) – Tough Patron (uncredited)
Black Spurs (1965) – Ambusher (uncredited)
The Great Race (1965) – Saloon Brawler (uncredited)
Morituri (1965) – Merchant Marine (uncredited)
Blindfold (1965) – Goon (uncredited)
Apache Uprising (1965) – Sgt. Hogan
Daniel Boone: Frontier Trail Rider (1966) – Cash Doyle
Our Man Flint (1966) – Gridley – a Guard (uncredited)
Harper (1966) – Puddler
Smoky (1966) – Ranchhand (uncredited)
Red Tomahawk (1967) – Prospector #2
Hostile Guns (1967) – Troublemaking Spectator
Waterhole #3 (1967) – Doc Quinlen 
Will Penny (1967) – Boetius Sullivan
The Bandits (1967) – Josh Racker
The Ambushers (1967) – Karl
The Helicopter Spies (1968) – Carl
Jigsaw (1968) – Arnie
5 Card Stud (1968) – Mace Jones
Un extraño en la casa (1968) – Walter
Number One (1969) – Roy Nelson
Paint Your Wagon (1969) – Hennessey
Halls of Anger (1970) – Harry Greco
Fools (1970) – Man in park 
Sometimes a Great Notion (1970) – Howie Elwood
Big Jake (1971) – Gunman at Bathhouse in Escondero (uncredited)
Brute Corps (1971) – Quinn
Journey Through Rosebud (1972) – Park Ranger
Cry for Me, Billy (1972) – Blacksmith
The Life and Times of Judge Roy Bean (1972) – Outlaw
The Getaway (1972) – Cully
Soylent Green (1973) – Donovan
Dillinger (1973) – Samuel Cowley
The Way We Were (1973) – Army Captain 
The Outfit (1973) – Al
The Treasure of Jamaica Reef (1974) – Chief Killer (uncredited)
Thunderbolt and Lightfoot (1974) – Dunlop
Chinatown (1974) – Claude Mulvihill
Nightmare Honeymoon (1974) – Sandy
99 and 44/100% Dead (1974) – Jake
Breakout (1975) – Sheriff Spencer
The Wind and the Lion (1975) – Admiral Chadwick
Framed (1975) – Haskins
Breakheart Pass (1975) – Chris Banion
Helter Skelter (1976) – Punchy
The Duchess and the Dirtwater Fox (1976) – Bloodworth
The Car (1977) – Ray Mott
Telefon (1977) – Doug Stark
The Gauntlet (1977) – Biker
Every Which Way But Loose (1978) – Woody (Black Widow)
Tom Horn (1980) – Lee Mendenhour
Foolin' Around (1980) – Blue
Any Which Way You Can (1980) – Moody (Black Widow)
Demonoid (1981) – Mark Baines
Bustin' Loose (1981) – Klan Leader
Honkytonk Man (1982) – Dub 
Red Dawn (1984) – Mr. Morris 
Day of the Survivalist  (1986)
The Night Stalker (1987) – Cook
Deadly Stranger (1988) – Charlie
Sudamerica, matar o morir (1989) 
Solar Crisis (1990) – Bartender 
The Set-Up (1995) – Older Guard

Television

Not for Hire (1959) – episode – The Hunting License 
Wagon Train (1959) – episode – The Estaban Zamora Story – Watkins (uncredited)
Peter Gunn (1959) – episode – The Lederer Story – Dutch
Wagon Train (1959) – episode – The Greenhorn Story – Bully (uncredited)
Yancy Derringer (1959) – episode – Longhair – Capt. MacBain (credited as “Roy Jensen”)
Bonanza (1959) – episode – The Magnificent Adah – Sledge (uncredited) 
Peter Gunn (1960) – episode – The Long Green Kill – Frank Garrett
Perry Mason (1961) – episode – The Case of the Malicious Mariner – Officer
Peter Gunn (1961) – episode – The Murder Bond – Regan 
Bonanza (1963) – episode – The Prime of Life – Jesse Wade 
Rawhide (1964) – episode – Incident of the Odyssey – Bit Part (uncredited) 
The Man from U.N.C.L.E. (1964) – episode – The Vulcan Affair – Assassin (uncredited)
Bonanza (1965) – episode – Five Sundowns to Sunup – Gang Member (uncredited) 
Bonanza (1965) – episode – The Brass Box – Harry
Daniel Boone (1965) – episode – The Trek – Jensen 
Laredo (1966) – episode – That's Noway, Thataway – Brawler (uncredited) 
T.H.E. Cat Episode 1 (1966) – Stavic
I Spy (1966) – episode – It's All Done with Mirrors – Tate 
Batman (1966) – episodes – A Riddle a Day Keeps the Riddler Away & When the Rat's Away, the Mice Will Play – Whitey
Daniel Boone (1966) – episode – The High Cumberland: Parts 1 & 2  – Cash Doyle  
Gunsmoke (1966) – episode – The Goldtakers – Troy
The Man from U.N.C.L.E. (1967) – episode – The Prince of Darkness Affair: Parts I & II  – Carl
The Invaders (1967) – episode – The Mutation – Alien #1
I Spy (1967) – episode – Magic Mirror – Roschovsky
The Andy Griffith Show (1967) – episode – Andy's Investment – Trooper Leroy Miller 
Hondo (1967) – episode – Hondo and the Judas – Bob Ford
Mannix (1967) – episode – Catalogue of Sins – Duane Toohey 
The Virginian (1968) – episode – The Storm Gate – Lueders 
Star Trek (1968) – episode – The Omega Glory – Cloud William
Mission: Impossible (1968) – episode – The Killing – Connie 
Daniel Boone (1968) – episode – Hero's Welcome – Luke 
I Spy (1968) – episode – Tag, You're It – Abrams
Gunsmoke (1968) – episode – Railroad – Larnen 
Gunsmoke (1968) – episode – The Victim  – Crow 
Bonanza (1969) – episode – The Wish – Craig 
Daniel Boone (1969) – episode – The Road to Freedom – Crane Hawkins
High Chaparral (1970) – episode – The Guns of Johnny Rondo – Jed Tate
Gunsmoke (1970) – episode – The Scavengers – Rath
Gunsmoke (1970) – episode – The Badge/II – Keller 
The F.B.I. (1970) – episode – The Dealer – Lobb McCoy 
Bearcats! (1971) – pilot movie – Powderkeg – Briggs
Nichols (1971) – episode – The One Eyed Mule's Time Has Come –  Bull
Mannix (1971) – episode – The Man Outside – First Man  
Bonanza (1972) – episode – Forever – Mr. Hanley
Cannon (1972) – episode – Murder by Moonlight – Swede
Kung Fu (1972) – episode – Pilot –  Fuller 
Kung Fu (1973) – episode – Superstition – Rupp 
Movin' On (1974) – episode – In Tandem – Attendant (uncredited) 
Mannix (1974) – episode – Trap for a Pigeon – Ozzie 
Gunsmoke (1974) – episode – The Colonel – Jeff Higgins
Kojak (1976) – episode – Dead Again – Frank Kelton
Little House on the Prairie (1976) – episode – The Bully Boys – George Galender 
Barnaby Jones (1976) – episode – Silent Vendetta – Hastings 
How the West Was Won (1977) – episode – Episode #1.1 – Sergeant Macklin 
Quincy, M.E. (1977) – episode – The Hero Syndrome – Jake Hennafy 
The Rockford Files (1977) – episodes – The Trees, the Bees and T.T. Flowers: Parts 1 & 2  – Winchell 
Charlie's Angels (1978) – episode – Mother Angel – Max 
Vega$ (1979) – episode – Classic Connection – First Assistant
Fantasy Island (1979) – episode – Goose for the Gander/The Stuntman – Snuffy Harris
How the West Was Won (1979) – TV miniseries – episode – The Slavers – Trako
The Dukes of Hazzard (1980) – episode – The Great Santa Claus Chase – Lacey 
Simon & Simon (1982) – episode – The Hottest Ticket in Town – Nelson
Bret Maverick (1982) – episode – Dateline: Sweetwater – Monte 
Quincy M.E. (1983) – episode – Guilty Until Proven Innocent – Dade
Simon & Simon (1983) – episode – D.J., D.O.A. – Tony 
Magnum, P.I. (1986) – episode – One Picture Is Worth – Jack Wilkins
Knight Rider (1986) – episode – The Scent of Roses – Purdue 
Kung Fu: The Movie (1986) – TV Movie – Warehouse Foreman
Dallas (1986) – episode – Return to Camelot: Part 1 
Simon & Simon (1987) – episode – Desperately Seeking Dacody – Trucker Fred 
Simon & Simon (1987) – episode – Tanner, P.I. for Hire – Artie Pike
Police Story: The Watch Commander (1988) – TV movie – Kearns

Stuntman
Note: Jenson went uncredited as a Stuntman in all the films he did.

Samson and Delilah (1949)
The Restless Gun (1957) – TV series – unknown episodes – Credited
The Buccaneer (1958)
Warlock (1959)
Flaming Star (1960)
North to Alaska (1960)
Atlantis, the Lost Continent (1961)
How the West Was Won (1962)
McLintock! (1963)
The Great Escape (1963)
I Spy (1965) – TV Series – unknown episodes – Credited
Shenandoah (1965)
The Rounders (1965)
Camelot (1967) 
Bonanza (1967) – TV series – episode – False Witness
Dillinger (1973)

References

External links

 

1927 births
2007 deaths
20th-century American male actors
20th-century Canadian male actors
American male film actors
American male television actors
American stunt performers
BC Lions players
Calgary Stampeders players
Canadian emigrants to the United States
Canadian football offensive linemen
Deaths from cancer in California
Male actors from Calgary
Male actors from Los Angeles
Players of American football from Los Angeles
Players of Canadian football from Alberta
Canadian football people from Calgary
UCLA Bruins football players
United States Navy personnel of World War II
University of California, Los Angeles alumni
Players of Canadian football from Los Angeles